Xinhua Road Sports Centre Stadium is a multi-purpose stadium in Wuhan, Hubei Province, China. It is currently used mostly for football matches. The stadium has a capacity for 22,140 people. It opened in 1954.

Competitions 
AFC U-19 Women's Championship 2009
AFC U-16 Women's Championship 2015

References

Football venues in Wuhan
Athletics (track and field) venues in China
Multi-purpose stadiums in China
Sports venues in Wuhan